Calliopum is a genus of small flies of the family Lauxaniidae.

Description

Most, but not all, are luscious black or metallic flies. They are smaller than 5 mm and usually have iridescent eyes. Adults can be found from May until December in meadows and hedge rows. The larvae may be phytophagous or saprophagous, mainly feeding on rotting vegetable matter or mining clover leaves.

Distribution
These species are present on most of Europe, in the eastern Palearctic realm, in the Near East and in North Africa.

Species
C. acrostichalis Sasakawa & Kozanek, 1995
C. aeneum (Fallén, 1820)
C. albomaculatum (Strobl, 1909)
C. annulatum (Becker, 1907)
C. blaisdelli (Cresson, 1920)
C. caucasicum Shatalkin, 1996
C. ceianui Papp, 1984
C. dolabriforme Sasakawa & Kozanek, 1995
C. elisae (Meigen, 1826)
C. ellisiorum Shatalkin, 2000
C. geniculatum (Fabricius, 1805)
C. hispanicum (Mik, 1881)
C. indecorum (Loew, 1862)
C. livingstoni (Coquillett, 1898)
C. nigerrimum (Melander, 1913)
C. oosterbroeki Shatalkin, 2000
C. pacificum (Cole, 1912)
C. potanini Czerny, 1935
C. quadrisetosum (Thomson, 1869)
C. rufipes (Czerny, 1932)
C. sakhalinicum Shatalkin, 1996
C. scutellata (Curran, 1926)
C. simillimum (Collin, 1933)
C. splendidum Papp, 1978
C. tripodium Carles-Tolra, 2001
C. tunisicum Papp, 1981

References

External links
 Biolib
 Calliopum photos
 University of Michigan, Calliopum tree

Lauxaniidae
Articles containing video clips
Muscomorph flies of Europe
Schizophora genera